This is a list of dams and reservoirs in the U.S. state of Washington, and pertinent data. According to the Washington State Department of Ecology, as of 2020 there were 1226 dams in the state. Of 39 counties, King County had the most dams, 125.

The largest dam in Washington, in terms of structural volume, reservoir capacity and electricity production, is the Grand Coulee Dam on the Columbia River.

List

Removed dams
Condit Dam, on the White Salmon River in Klickitat County
Elwha Dam and Glines Canyon Dam, on the Elwha River in Clallam County

See also
List of dams in the Columbia River watershed
List of hydroelectric power stations in Washington

Notes

References

External links
 Washington State Dams map

 
 
Washington
Dams